"Iz U wit Me" is a song recorded by Da Youngsta's for their 1993 album The Aftermath, and released as a single on July 15, 1993.

The song was produced by Pete Rock for Mecca & the Soul Brother Productions. The track contains a diss towards Kris Kross.

Music video
The music video was directed by Treach and James Brummel and was released in 1993. The music video features cameos by Pete Rock, Treach, Apache, and Havoc of Mobb Deep.

References

1993 songs
1993 singles
American hip hop songs
Hardcore hip hop songs
East West Records singles
Atlantic Records singles
Song recordings produced by Pete Rock